This is a list of regular military formations of the Armed Forces of the Russian Federation participating in the Russo-Ukrainian War from 2014.

Crimea 
Before the invasion and annexation of Crimea, most of the Russian Federation's forces based in Crimea according to the terms of the Kharkiv Pact were navy ships of the Black Sea Fleet and their support staff. Of ground combat units, only the 510th Naval Infantry Brigade in Feodosiia and the 810th Naval Infantry Brigade in Simferopol were legally stationed on Ukrainian territory.

From February 20, 2014, a number of Russian army and airborne units entered Ukraine without permission, to occupy the Crimean peninsula, including elements of the following:

 7th Air Assault Division (Novorossiysk)
 3rd Spetsnaz Brigade (Tolyatti)
 10th Spetsnaz Brigade (Krasnodar)
 16th Spetsnaz Brigade (Tambov)
 18th Motor Rifle Brigade (Grozny)
 22nd Spetsnaz Brigade (Stepnoy)
 31st Air Assault Brigade (Ulyanovsk)
 291st Artillery Brigade (Troitskaya)
 25th Spetsnaz Regiment (Stavropol)
 45th Spetsnaz Regiment (Kubinka, Moscow region)
 382nd Naval Infantry Battalion (Temryuk)
 727th Naval Infantry Battalion (Astrakhan)
 Special Operations Forces Command (Prokhladny)

Donbas  
The first wave of the invasion of regular troops of the Russian Federation came in August 2014.

As of November 2016, troops from 75 Russian military units were identified in the Donbas according to investigations of the InformNapalm volunteer community.

On the basis of some units of the invasion, as well as the mercenaries and collaboration, a regular structure was created with two Army Corps: 1st Army Corps in Donetsk and  2nd Army Corps in Lugansk.

July 2014 
Diversion and reconnaissance teams, which entered Ukrainian territory beginning on July 14, 2014, were formed from elements of the following units:
 2nd Spetsnaz Brigade
 10th Spetsnaz Brigade
 45th Guards Independent Reconnaissance Regiment (Kubinka, Moscow Oblast)
 173rd Separate Guards Reconnaissance Company, 106th Guards Tula Airborne Division (Tula)
 Reconnaissance Battalion, 9th Separate Motor Rifle Brigade (former 84th Separate Reconnaissance Battalion)
 Reconnaissance Battalion, 18th Guards Motor Rifle Brigade (formerly 18th Separate Reconnaissance Battalion)

August 2014 
Battalion tactical groups, which entered Ukrainian territory beginning on August 11, 2014, were formed from elements of the following units:
 17th Guards Motor Rifle Brigade
 18th Guards Motor Rifle Brigade
 21st Guards Motor Rifle Brigade
 33rd Mountain Motor Rifle Brigade
 247th Guards Air Assault Regiment, 7th Guards Mountain Air Assault Division
 104th Guards Air Assault Regiment, 76th Guards Air Assault Division
 331st Guards Airborne Regiment, 98th Guards Airborne Division
 137th Guards Airborne Regiment, 106th Guards Airborne Division
 31st Guards Air Assault Brigade
 2nd Spetsnaz Brigade

February 2015  
As of February 2015, elements of the following Russian units were fighting in the Donbas:

Northern Operational Area 
 2nd Guards Tamanskaya Motor Rifle Division (elements)
 8th Guards Mountain Motor Rifle Brigade
 18th Guards Motor Rifle Brigade
 19th Motor Rifle Brigade
 20th Guards Motor Rifle Division
 23rd Guards Motor Rifle Brigade
 27th Guards Motor Rifle Brigade
 28th Motor Rifle Brigade
 32nd Motor Rifle Brigade
 33rd Mountain Motor Rifle Brigade
 37th Guards Motor Rifle Brigade
 31st Guards Air Assault Brigade
 104th Guards Air Assault Regiment, 76th Guards Air Assault Division
 217th Guards Airborne Regiment, 98th Guards Airborne Division
 137th Guards Airborne Regiment, 106th Guards Airborne Division
 10th Spetsnaz Brigade
 346th Spetsnaz Brigade
 25th Spetsnaz Regiment
 FSB Special Operations Centre
 Dzerzhinsky Division (elements)
 107th Operational Brigade
 Chechen Ministry of Internal Affairs Combined Battalion
 5th Guards Tank Brigade
 6th Tank Brigade
 13th Guards Tank Regiment, 4th Guards Kantemirovskaya Tank Division
 1st Guards Rocket Brigade
 79th Guards Rocket Brigade
 232nd Rocket Artillery Brigade
 288th Artillery Brigade
 291st Artillery Brigade
 385th Guards Artillery Brigade
 1065th Guards Artillery Regiment, 98th Guards Airborne Division
 573rd Separate Artillery Reconnaissance Battalion
 67th Anti-Aircraft Rocket Brigade
 74th SIGINT Regiment
 78th Materiel Support Brigade
 7015th Armaments Maintenance Base
 7016th Armaments Maintenance Base
 282nd Armaments Repair Base
 29th Railway Brigade

Southern Operational Area 
 2nd Guards Tamanskaya Motor Rifle Division (elements)
 9th Separate Motor Rifle Brigade
 138th Guards Motor Rifle Brigade
 11th Guards Air Assault Brigade
 45th Guards Independent Reconnaissance Regiment
 561st Naval Spetsnaz Battalion
 54th Reconnaissance Units Training Centre
 Dzerzhinsky Division (elements)
 12th Guards Tank Regiment, 4th Guards Kantemirovskaya Tank Division
 200th Artillery Brigade
 268th Guards Artillery Brigade
 1140th Guards Artillery Regiment, 76th Guards Air Assault Division
 59th Communications Brigade
 95th Communications Brigade
 31st Engineer Regiment
 3rd Tactical Infantry Division (Yüksekova)

References